Diego Mesaglio (born February 20, 1984 in Luján, Buenos Aires Province, Argentina) is a well known Argentine actor and singer.

Career 
Diego Mesaglio began his career in television with an advertisement for Banco Río in 1991. In 1994, he had a small participation in the television series Montaña Rusa. In 1994, he made his film debut, with the movie Amigomío. In 1995, he was part of the cast of the television series Amigovios. In 1995, he had a small participation in the television series Poliladron. From 1996 to 1998, he was part of the cast of the youth soap opera Chiquititas. In 1999, he was part of the cast of the television series Trillizos ¡dijo la partera!. From 1999 to 2000, he was part of the cast of the youth television series Verano del '98. In 2000, he was part of the cast of the television series Cabecita. In August 2001, he made a short lived return to Chiquititas. In 2001, he was summoned by Cris Morena for the special Chiquititas de Oro where he and the most prominent of cast members of every season came together to receive the award Chiquititas de Oro. From 2002 to 2003, he was part of the cast of the youth television series Rebelde Way. From 2004 to 2005, he was part of the cast of the youth television series Floricienta. In 2007, he was part of the cast of the television series Romeo y Julieta. From 2008 to 2009, he was part of the cast of the television series Por amor a vos. In 2009, he acted in the movie Matar a Videla. In 2010, he was part of the cast of the television series Yo soy virgen. In 2011, he was part of the cast of the television series Atrapados. In 2012, he makes a small participation in the television series Graduados. In 2013, he makes a small participation in the television series Solamente vos. In 2013, he acted in the movie Metegol. From 2013 to 2014, he was part of the cast of the television series Los Vecinos en Guerra. From 2017 to 2018, he was part of the cast of the television series Un gallo para Esculapio. From 2018 to 2019, he performed the play Se alquila with Chiquititas co-star Santiago Stieben.

Health issues 
Diego Mesaglio announced during 2016 that he had vision problems and needed a cornea transplant. He lost sight on his left eye when, after a home accident in which he got hit on his forehead, an alcohol bottle tipped over and fell on his eye.

Filmography

Television

Movies

Theater

Television Programs

See also
 List of Argentines

References

External links
 
 Russian website, in English

1984 births
Living people
Argentine male actors